Sophia Olivia Smith (born August 10, 2000) is an American soccer player who plays for Portland Thorns FC in the National Women's Soccer League and the United States national team. In March 2017, she was called up to the senior national team for two international friendlies against Russia. She played in college for Stanford University, helping her team win the national title in 2019. On January 16, 2020, she was selected by the Thorns as the top overall pick in the 2020 NWSL College Draft.

Early life
Smith attended Fossil Ridge High School in Fort Collins, Colorado. She was named First-Team All-Conference her freshman year. Smith also played for the varsity basketball team. Smith began playing college soccer at Stanford University starting in 2018, scoring 7 goals that season and 17 the following season. In the 2019 College Cup, she scored a hat-trick to help Stanford defeat UCLA in the semifinal; Stanford went on to win the national title via a penalty shootout in the final.

Club career
Smith took part in the NWSL draft on January 16, 2020. She was drafted with the #1 pick by the Portland Thorns FC.

In 2022, Smith was recognized as the league MVP. The Thorns would go onto win the NWSL Championship with Smith scoring the first goal and being named Championship MVP.

International career
Smith was part of the U-17 team at the 2016 FIFA U-17 World Cup. In early 2017, she scored nine goals in six games, which is believed to be a U.S. Youth Women's National Team record for goals in six consecutive games. On March 31, 2017, Smith was called up for the first time to the senior U.S. national team.

After being a part of the USA U-20 squad that finished runner-up at the 2018 CONCACAF U-20 Championship, Smith was named to the USA U-20 roster for the 2018 FIFA U-20 World Cup.

Smith was called up to the senior national team for the first training camp of 2020 from January 5 to 15 after having been called into a talent identification camp in December 2019.

On November 27, 2020, she earned her first cap in a game against the Netherlands, becoming the first player born in the 2000s to appear for the senior national team.

Career statistics

Club

International

International goals

Honors and awards
Stanford Cardinal
 NCAA Division I Women's Soccer Championship: 2019
Portland Thorns FC
 NWSL Championship: 2022
 NWSL Challenge Cup: 2021
 NWSL Community Shield: 2020
NWSL Shield
Winners (2): 2021
 Women's International Champions Cup: 2021
United States U20
 CONCACAF Women's U-20 Championship: 2020
 Sud Ladies Cup: 2018

United States
 SheBelieves Cup: 2021; 2022
 CONCACAF Women's Championship: 2022
Individual

 NWSL Most Valuable Player: 2022
 NWSL Championship Game MVP: 2022

 NWSL Best XI: 2022
 NWSL Player of the Month: June 2022
 US Soccer Female Player of the Year: 2022
 Sud Ladies Cup Best Player: 2018
 Sud Ladies Cup Top Scorer: 2018

References

Match reports

External links

 
 U.S. Soccer player profile
 

2000 births
Living people
American women's soccer players
Soccer players from Colorado
People from Windsor, Colorado
United States women's under-20 international soccer players
United States women's international soccer players
Women's association football forwards
Stanford Cardinal women's soccer players
Portland Thorns FC players
Portland Thorns FC draft picks
African-American women's soccer players
African-American soccer players
21st-century African-American sportspeople
21st-century African-American women
20th-century African-American sportspeople
20th-century African-American women
National Women's Soccer League players
American soccer players
Association football forwards